AMT, or amt,  may refer to:

Science and technology
 Alpha-Methyltryptamine (αMT), a synthetic psychedelic of the tryptamine family
 Aminomethyltransferase, gene for an enzyme that breaks down glycine
 Air Motion Transformer, a type of loudspeaker invented by Oskar Heil
 Amorphous metal transformer, a kind of energy efficient transformer
 Audio-magnetotellurics, a higher-frequency variant of magnetotellurics
 Intel Active Management Technology, a technology for remotely managing and securing computers
 Amazon Mechanical Turk

Transportation
 Aircraft maintenance technician, a term used in the US
 AMT, the ICAO code for ATA Airlines, a defunct US airline
 AMT, the National Rail code for Aldermaston railway station in the county of Berkshire, UK
 Automated manual transmission, gearbox technology
 Aviation Maintenance Technician, a US Coast Guard rating
 Amata Airport, IATA airport code "AMT"

Organizations
 Agence métropolitaine de transport, Montréal, Canada, replaced by the Réseau de transport métropolitain and Metropolitan Regional Transportation Authority
 Aluminum Model Toys, US
 American Tower (NYSE: AMT), an American telecommunications company
 Arcadia Machine & Tool, a former American firearms company
 Association for Manufacturing Technology, US
 Australian Mathematics Trust, in education
 AMT Coffee, defunct UK chain of kiosks
 AMT Genova,, public transport in Italy

Time standards
 Airy Mean Time, a time standard used for timekeeping on Mars
 Armenia Time, national time zone code for Armenia

Other uses 
 Amt, type of administrative division governing a group of municipalities, today only in Germany 
 Alternative minimum tax, US
 Atmospheric Measurement Techniques, a European Geosciences Union journal

See also
 
 
 AMTS (disambiguation)